Stephen "Steve" Brace (born 7 July 1961, in Bridgend) is a former long-distance runner from Wales, who represented Great Britain in the men's marathon at the 1992 and 1996 Summer Olympics. He finished in 27th (2:17:49) and in 60th (2:23.28) place respectively.

Brace triumphed at the Paris Marathon in 1989 and 1990 and at the Berlin Marathon in 1991. His personal best is 2:10:35 (second place at the Houston Marathon 1996).

Brace is currently the Director of Welsh Athletics

International competitions

Road races

References

External links

UK Olympics

1961 births
Living people
Sportspeople from Bridgend
Welsh male long-distance runners
Welsh male marathon runners
Olympic athletes of Great Britain
Athletes (track and field) at the 1992 Summer Olympics
Athletes (track and field) at the 1996 Summer Olympics
Commonwealth Games competitors for Wales
Athletes (track and field) at the 1990 Commonwealth Games
Athletes (track and field) at the 1998 Commonwealth Games
Paris Marathon male winners
Berlin Marathon male winners